P. M. Masherov Vitebsk State University, commonly known simply as Vitebsk State University,bis a tertiary institute in Vitebsk, Belarus.

References

External links 
 University website in English

Universities in Belarus
Buildings and structures in Vitebsk
Universities and institutes established in the Soviet Union